In Contact is the fourth studio album by Australian progressive metal band Caligula's Horse. It was released through Inside Out Music on 15 September 2017. It is the first album to feature rhythm guitarist Adrian Goleby and drummer Josh Griffin, and the last to feature bassist Dave Couper.

Track listing 
All lyrics and music by Grey and Vallen.

Personnel 

 Caligula's Horse

 Jim Grey – lead vocals
 Sam Vallen – lead guitar, "everything else"
 Adrian Goleby – guitar
 Dave Couper – bass
 Josh Griffin – drums

 Additional musicians

Jørgen Munkeby – saxophone, backing vocals (track 10)
Jake Morton, John Grey, Mitch Legg, Rick Collins, Sam Grey, Zac Greensill and Zak Muller – additional screamed, shouted, and sung vocals

Production 

 Connor Maguire – artwork
Chris Stevenson-Mangos – design and layout of the booklet
Adrian Goleby – booklet photography
 Sam Vallen – production, audio engineering, mixing (tracks 4, 6-10)
Dale Prinsse  – audio engineering
 Jens Bogren – mastering
Forrester Savell – mixing (tracks 1, 2 and 5)
Caleb James – mixing (track 3)

Charts

References

2017 albums
Caligula's Horse (band) albums